Sallent is a municipality in the comarca of Bages, Province of Barcelona, in the Autonomous Community of Catalonia, Spain. The river Llobregat divides the municipality into two halves. Its main resources are mining and industry. It was the birthplace of Saint Anthony Mary Claret (1807–1870)

Demography 
According to Spanish census data, this is the population of Sallent in recent years.

References

External links
La Disputació de Barcelona - Municipal Directory: Sallent 
 Government data pages 

Municipalities in Bages